Louisville (pronounced LEW-iss-vill) is a city in Winston County, Mississippi. The population was 6,631 at the 2010 census. It is the county seat of Winston County.

History
Like Winston County, Louisville is named for Louis Winston (1784–1824), a colonel in the militia, a prominent lawyer, and a judge of the Mississippi Supreme Court. In 1863 Union Colonel Benjamin Grierson marched 900 troops through Louisville during his raid through Mississippi. There was no fighting in Winston County.

In 1927, a mob of 1,000 white men from Louisville, lynched two African-Americans, Jim and Mark Fox by wrapping them in barbed wire and setting them on fire. The Foxes were accused of killing Clarence Nichols, a white man who started a fight with them because they would not let him pass their Ford touring car in his Chevrolet.

On April 28, 2014, Louisville was hit by an EF4 tornado, resulting in ten fatalities.

Geography
Louisville is located at  (33.122931, -89.056182). It is known by many as the "Front porch of the South".

Demographics

2020 census

As of the 2020 United States Census, there were 6,072 people, 2,309 households, and 1,589 families residing in the city.

2000 census
As of the census of 2000, there were 7,006 people, 2,641 households, and 1,817 families living in the city. The population density was 464.5 people per square mile (179.4/km). There were 2,884 housing units at an average density of 191.2 per square mile (73.8/km). The racial makeup of the city was 46.29% White, 52.46% African American, 0.13% Native American, 0.17% Asian, 0.44% from other races, and 0.51% from two or more races. Hispanic or Latino of any race were 1.66% of the population.

There were 2,641 households, out of which 34.3% had children under the age of 18 living with them, 40.4% were married couples living together, 25.0% had a female householder with no husband present, and 31.2% were non-families. 28.2% of all households were made up of individuals, and 14.4% had someone living alone who was 65 years of age or older. The average household size was 2.55 and the average family size was 3.12.

In the city, the population was spread out, with 28.9% under the age of 18, 9.3% from 18 to 24, 24.7% from 25 to 44, 19.8% from 45 to 64, and 17.3% who were 65 years of age or older. The median age was 35 years. For every 100 females, there were 80.6 males. For every 100 females age 18 and over, there were 73.8 males.

The median income for a household in the city was $27,485, and the median income for a family was $31,750. Males had a median income of $29,951 versus $17,491 for females. The per capita income for the city was $15,857. About 24.8% of families and 28.5% of the population were below the poverty line, including 39.3% of those under age 18 and 20.9% of those age 65 or over.

Education
Prior to 1970, Louisville maintained a dual system of schools for White and Black students. Black students were educated at the Louisville Colored School, also known as Camile Street School, whereas White students had their own schools, including Louisville High School. Several federal laws and U.S. Supreme Court decisions forced this to change. In 1967, due to the Civil Rights Act of 1964, the school adopted a desegregation plan that in theory allowed students to choose which schools to attend. When the courts mandated that the schools be integrated, students from Louisville Colored School were allowed to attend Louisville High School. In order to preserve a segregated education for White students only, a segregation academy, Winston Academy was created. The City of Louisville is now served by the Louisville Municipal School District and Louisville High School. Private schools in Louisville include Winston Academy, which as of 2020 was still over 99% white, and Grace Christian School.

Culture

The American Heritage "Big Red" Fire Museum is located in Louisville. This museum features a collection of restored antique fire equipment and fire engines. The Strand Theatre, in downtown Louisville, is an historic movie theater which now serves as an art and music venue. Louisville native Carl Jackson plays an annual Christmas concert at the theater to raise money for the building's restoration.

Transportation
Mississippi Highway 14 enters east from the Alabama state line through Macon and when it enters in Louisville it is also known as Main Street. It leaves westbound eventually traveling to the Mississippi River where it ends.

Mississippi Highway 15 enters from the north from Ackerman, MS, then meets up with Mississippi Highway 25 just north of Louisville. M.S. 25 enters from the north from Starkville. M.S. 15 and 25 travel together along the western side of town. At the southern edge of town they separate: M.S. 15 traveling to Philadelphia & Interstate 20; and M.S. 25 to Jackson.

Notable people
 Van Chancellor, basketball coach
 Thomas D. Clark, noted historian
 Doug Cunningham, former professional football player
 Drew Eubanks, American basketball player
 Mark Hudspeth, football coach
 Carl Jackson, country music songwriter
 E. Grady Jolly, U.S. circuit judge
 Andy Kennedy, basketball coach
 Coby Miller, Olympic athlete
 Matthew Mitchell, basketball coach, University of Kentucky Lady Wildcats
 Kim Rosamond, basketball coach for Tennessee Tech Golden Eagles
 Lisa Stewart, country music singer and TV host
 Marcus Thames, Major League Baseball player and coach

References

External links
 City of Louisville

Cities in Mississippi
Cities in Winston County, Mississippi
County seats in Mississippi